Prince of Darkness is a box set of four CDs by Ozzy Osbourne released in 2005. The first two CDs are Osbourne's solo work containing various studio recordings, live tracks, b-sides, demos and outtakes, and the last two CDs are collaborations on disc three and cover songs on disc four. The cover versions were recorded for this box set compilation, but were released on a stand-alone album entitled Under Cover later in the year.

Notably, the album tracks from Blizzard of Ozz and Diary of a Madman included in the set are taken from the 2002 remasters of those albums, for which the original drum and bass tracks were replaced with new recordings by Osbourne's then-current bassist Robert Trujillo and drummer Mike Bordin, as a management response to legal action by original bassist Bob Daisley and drummer Lee Kerslake for unpaid royalty fees. Likewise, the tracks from Bark at the Moon are similarly taken from the 2002 remaster, for which they were remixed and altered.

Track listing

Charts
Album - Billboard (America)

Certifications and sales

References

Epic Records albums
Ozzy Osbourne compilation albums
2005 compilation albums